Mario Vincenzo Zucchini (5 July 1910 – 3 February 1997) was an Italian ice hockey player. He competed in the men's tournament at the 1936 Winter Olympics.

References

External links
 

1910 births
1997 deaths
Ice hockey players at the 1936 Winter Olympics
Olympic ice hockey players of Italy
Sportspeople from the Province of Campobasso